This is the discography of Army of the Pharaohs, an American hip-hop supergroup.

Albums

Studio albums 
 2006: The Torture Papers
 2007: Ritual of Battle
 2010: The Unholy Terror
 2014: In Death Reborn
 2014: Heavy Lies the Crown

Compilation albums 
 2003: Rare Shit, Collabos and Freestyles
 2010: Babygrande presents: The Pharaoh Philes

EPs 
 1998: The Five Perfect Exertions

Mixtapes 
 2006: The Bonus Papers
 2007: After Torture There's Pain

Appearances

Albums 
 2006: Various — Babygrande 2006 (Battle Cry)

Miscellaneous 
 Unknown: Chief Kamachi — Cult Classic (The 5 Perfect Exertions)

Soundtracks

NBA Live 07 Soundtrack

Midnight Club 3: DUB Edition soundtrack

Midnight Club: Los Angeles soundtrack

Credits

Featuring 
 2004: 7L & Esoteric – DC2: Bars of Death (This is War)
 2008: King Syze — The Labor Union (Mayhem)
 2008: DJ Whoo Kid Presents King Magnetic — The Co-$ign (Black Christmas (Remix))
 2012: Vinnie Paz – God of the Serengeti – (Battle Hymn)

Hip hop discographies